Preston White Campbell (January 24, 1874 – July 2, 1954) was a Virginia lawyer who served as the chief justice of the Supreme Court of Virginia. Born in Abingdon, Virginia, he was educated by tutors and at the Abingdon Male Academy.  He read law in the office of Francis B. Hutton, later a circuit judge, and after being admitted to the bar, attended the University of Virginia for further study under Professor John B. Minor.  He began practice in Abingdon and was the youngest member of the Constitutional Convention of 1901-02.   In 1911, he became Commonwealth's Attorney of Washington County, Virginia and served until 1914 when he became judge of the Twenty-Third Circuit Court.  When Judge Joseph L. Kelly retired in 1924, Judge Campbell was elected to the Supreme Court of Appeals and, in 1931, became chief justice.  He retired from the court in 1946.

References

Virginia lawyers
Delegates to Virginia Constitutional Convention of 1901
20th-century American politicians
Politicians from Abingdon, Virginia
Chief Justices of the Supreme Court of Virginia
1874 births
1954 deaths
U.S. state supreme court judges admitted to the practice of law by reading law
Virginia circuit court judges